Marco Antonio Arellano Ortega (born 29 December 1989) is a Chilean public administrator who was elected as a member of the Chilean Constitutional Convention.

References

External links
Profile at Lista del Pueblo

Living people
1989 births
21st-century Chilean politicians
Members of the List of the People
Members of the Chilean Constitutional Convention
University of Concepción alumni